Percelia Estate is a suburb of Johannesburg, South Africa. It is located in Region E of the City of Johannesburg Metropolitan Municipality.

History
The suburb is situated on part of an old Witwatersrand farm called Klipfontein. It became a suburb on 14 September 1938. It takes its name from the first names from the land owners Percy Michels and Elias Sandler.

References

Johannesburg Region E